Manuel Belo Correia Dias (born 24 March 1919) is a Portuguese retired professional football player. He was born in Ovar.

He played as a forward, spending his entire career with FC Porto. In the 1941-42 edition of the Portuguese championship he was the top scorer, with 36 goals.

External links

FC Porto players
Portuguese footballers
Possibly living people
1919 births
Association football forwards